The Charyn (Şaryn) is a river in the Almaty Province of Kazakhstan. It flows through the Charyn National Park and merges into the Ili River, which is considered to be the largest artery of Lake Balkhash. It runs through the territory of Kegen and Uighur regions, forming the Charyn Canyon.

The Moinak Hydro Power Plant lies on the river.

Description
The Sharyn river is full-flowing due to many tributaries that flow into it from the Northern slope of the Terskei and Kungei Alatau ranges. With its waters, it cuts a canyon through the Eastern parts of the Zhalanash depression and the Toraigyr mountains.
In the Zhalanash valley, the canyon is called Aktogay, which means White stream in Kazakh, due to its trapezoidal shape.

See also 
 Charyn National Park

References 

Rivers of Kazakhstan